Strachur-Dunoon is a shinty team from Cowal in Scotland. It is a merger at senior level of Strachur & District and Dunoon Camanachd. It started playing 2022.

History

Strachur & District had a significant history as a club, whilst Dunoon had aimed to revive shinty in the town during the late 2010s. Both clubs had folded before the Covid-19 pandemic due to a lack of players, but with an interest but not enough players to sustain two teams, as well as excellent facilities in both communities, the clubs agreed to a merger that preserved both clubs' identities. 

The combined team entered South Division Two in 2022 and finished 6th in the league. They played at both the Dunoon Stadium and Strachurmore Sports Centre.

External links
Strachur-Dunoon The Camanachd Association

Shinty
Team sports
Sport in Argyll and Bute